Francis David "Buddy" O'Grady (January 19, 1920 – February 19, 1992) was an American professional basketball player and coach.

A 5'11" guard from Georgetown University, O'Grady played professionally in the Basketball Association of America from 1946 to 1949. He competed for the Washington Capitols, St. Louis Bombers, and Providence Steamrollers and averaged 3.7 points per game.

For three seasons from 1949 to 1952, O'Grady served as head coach of Georgetown University's men's basketball team, with an overall record of 35-36 and no post-season tournament appearances. He was elected to Georgetown's Athletic Hall of Fame in 1958.

BAA career statistics

Regular season

Playoffs

Head coaching record

Sources

References

1920 births
1992 deaths
American men's basketball coaches
American men's basketball players
Georgetown Hoyas men's basketball coaches
Georgetown Hoyas men's basketball players
Guards (basketball)
Providence Steamrollers players
Rochester Royals players
St. Louis Bombers (NBA) players
St. Peter's Boys High School alumni
Washington Capitols players